Al Ramadi Stadium is a multi-use stadium in Ramadi, Iraq. It is currently used mostly for football matches and serves as the home stadium of Al Ramadi FC. The stadium holds 15,000 people.

See also 
List of football stadiums in Iraq

References

Football venues in Iraq